The complement component 1, q subcomponent-like 1 (or C1QL1) is encoded by a gene located at chromosome 17q21.31.  It is a secreted protein and is 258 amino acids in length.
The protein is widely expressed but its expression is highest in the brain and may also be involved in regulation of motor control.
The pre-mRNA of this protein is subject to RNA editing.

Protein function

Its physiological function is unknown.  It is a member of the C1Q domain proteins which have important signalling roles in inflammation and in adaptive immunity.

RNA editing

Editing type
The pre-mRNA of this protein is subject to A to I RNA editing, which is catalyzed by a family of adenosine deaminases acting on RNA (ADARs) that specifically recognize adenosines within double-stranded regions of pre-mRNAs and deaminate them to inosine.  Inosines are recognised as guanosine by the cell's translational machinery.  There are three members of the ADAR family: ADARs 1-3, with ADAR 1 and ADAR 2 being the only enzymatically active members.  ADAR 3 is thought to have a regulatory role in the brain.  ADAR 1 and ADAR 2 are widely expressed in tissues while ADAR 3 is restricted to the brain. The double-stranded regions of RNA are formed  by base-pairing between residues in a region complementary to the region of the editing site. This complementary region is  usually found  in a  neighbouring intron but can also be located in an exonic sequence.  The region that pairs with the editing region is known as an Editing Complementary Sequence (ECS).

Editing sites

The candidate editing sites were determined experimentally by comparison of cDNA sequences and genomically encoded DNA from the same individual to avoid single nucleotide polymorphisms (SNPs). Two of the three editing sites found in mouse gene were found in the human transcript.
However, only the Q/R site was detected in all RNA, with the T/A site detected just once. Both sites are found within exon 1.

Q/R site

This site is found in exon 1 at position 66. Editing results in a codon change from a Glutamine codon to an Arginine codon.

T/A site

This site is also found in exon 1, at position 63. It was only detected in one genomic sample indicating that the edited residue may be an SNP. However, the secondary structure of the RNA is predicted, around the editing site, to be  highly conserved in mice and humans. This indicates that the T/A site may still be shown to be a site of A to I RNA editing. Editing at this site would result in an amino acid change from a Threonine to an Alanine.

The ECS is also predicted to be found within exon 1 at a location 5' to the editing region.

Editing regulation
Editing is differentially expressed in the cerebellum and cortex. This regulation is also present in mice suggesting conservation of editing regulation. No editing has been detected in human lung, heart, kidney or spleen tissue.

Evolutionary conservation
The sequence of exon 1 is highly conserved in mammalian species  and editing of the pre-mRNA of this protein is likely to occur in mice, rat, dog and cow as well as humans. Even though the ECS is not conserved in non-mammals, an alternative ECS has been predicted in Zebrafish with a similar structure but in a different location. The Ecs is found downstream of the editing sites.

Effects on Protein structure
These predicted editing sites result in the translation of an Arginine instead of a Glutamine at the Q/R site and an Alanine instead of a Threonine at the T/A site.  These codon changes are nonsynomonous.   Since the editing sites are located just before a collagen like trimerization domain, editing may effect protein oligomerization. This region is also likely to be a protease domain. It is not known if the amino acid changes caused by editing could have an effect on these domains.

References

Further reading

External links
 DARNED (DAtabase of RNa EDiting in humans)
 

RNA splicing
Gene expression